Trewithick is a hamlet in the parish of St Stephen by Launceston Rural, Cornwall, England, United Kingdom.

References

Hamlets in Cornwall